The 1996 Little League World Series took place between August 19 and August 24 in Williamsport, Pennsylvania. The Fu-Hsing Little League of Kaohsiung, Taiwan, defeated Cranston Western Little League of Cranston, Rhode Island, in the championship game of the 50th Little League World Series.

Qualification

Pool play

Elimination round

Notable players
Jeff Clement (Marshalltown, Iowa) - Former MLB player
Adam Loewen (Surrey, British Columbia) - Former MLB Player
Clete Thomas (Panama City, Florida) - Former MLB player

External links

Little League World Series
Little League World Series
Little League World Series
Little League World Series